Malachoherca is a genus of moth in the family Lecithoceridae. It contains the species Malachoherca ardensa, which is found in China (Sichuan).

References

External links 
 Natural History Museum Lepidoptera genus database

Lecithoceridae
Monotypic moth genera